"Henna" is a song by Swedish pop artist of Iranian origin Cameron Cartio featuring the raï Algerian singer Khaled. Music was composed by Alex Papaconstantinou to lyrics by Khaled (Arabic) and Cameron Cartio in Persian language. The song was produced by Alex Papaconstantinou and mastered at Cutting Room in Stockholm.

The song was from the debut album of Cameron Cartio entitled Borderless. The Khaled involvement came after Cameron had broken up with his girlfriend who was a huge Khaled fan. So Cartio, then an aspiring and relatively unknown artist wrote the lyrics in his own conlang and sent them to Khaled, who agreed to add his own part as a tribute to Cartio's ex-girlfriend.

The song was released on Sony/BMG and Universal and for the Arab World on EMI Arabia. In addition to popularity in Sweden and throughout the Iranian diaspora, the song became hugely popular in the Arab World basically because of the involvement of Khaled in the Arab diaspora.

Track list
Original 2005 release in Sweden
Henna (3:12)
Henna (extended version) (3:51)
2006 release in Sweden
Henna (Spanish version) featuring Khaled (3:12)
Henna (Dari version) featuring Khaled (3:12)
Khaled appeared with courtesy of Universal where he was signed

Spanish version
As had happened with his earlier 2005 hit "Roma", Cameron Cartio released a Spanish language version of "Henna" featuring Khaled in Spain with the Cartio conlang being replaced by Spanish, although the Khaled verses in Arabic were kept the same.

A music video with the Spanish lyrics was released by Cameron's brother Alec Cartio. In addition to the new Spanish version, the 4-track maxi CD included separately the original conlang version and also two remixes by Ferrero.

Track list of the Spain release
Henna (extended Spanish version) featuring Khaled (3:51)
Henna (Ferrero single remix) featuring Khaled (3:43)
Henna (original version) featuring Khaled (3:13)
Henna (Ferrero extended remix) featuring Khaled (4:10)

In popular culture
Cartio and Khaled were invited to perform the song at the 2006 European Athletics Championships held in August 2006 in Gothenburg, Sweden. They performed the song live in the opening ceremonies to the games on 7 August 2006, also broadcast live internationally via the Swedish television station SVT.

Charts

References

2005 songs
Cameron Cartio songs
Khaled (musician) songs
Songs written by Alex P
Song recordings produced by Alex P
Songs written by Marcus Englof
Songs written by Khalid (singer)